Tondar Missile is an Iranian Anti-tank guided missile fired from the barrels of T-72 tanks. This Iranian missile which has been manufactured by Ministry of Defence and Armed Forces Logistics (Iran), is launched from a 125 mm cannon barrel. Tondar-missile is able to destroy diverse targets at 4 kilometers distances.

Iranian experts have applied the capabilities of the Tosan (missile) in the manufacturing process of Tondar-missile, that means: this anti-tank missile has the capability to target both fixed/moving targets on land and sea. In the meanwhile, this missile has the capability of destroying low-speed flying targets; and that's due to the kind of Tondar guidance. It is said to be a copy of the AT-11 Sniper Soviet missile. The warhead of the Tondar missile is lighter than that of the AT-11 Sniper missile which may indicate design changes or poor data reporting.

According to the commander of the Islamic Republic of Iran's army in the Fars region: It was the first time that in the exercise of Beit al-Moqaddas 26 in May 2014, three Iranian missiles of Dehlaviyeh, Tondar and Tusan were tested.

See also 
 List of military equipment manufactured in Iran
 Islamic Republic of Iran Army
 Toophan
 Kheibar Shekan

References

Post–Cold War weapons of Iran
Anti-tank guided missiles of Iran